Michael Buckley may refer to:
 Michael Buckley (author) (born 1969), children's book author
 Michael Buckley (civil servant) (born 1939), former Parliamentary and Health Service Ombudsman
 Michael Buckley (internet celebrity) (born 1975), American Internet celebrity, comedian and vlogger
 Michael Buckley (professor), clinical professor at the University of Texas at Arlington
 Mick Buckley (1953–2013), English footballer
 Michael J. Buckley (1931–2019), Jesuit professor of theology at Santa Clara University
 Michael Buckley Jr. (1902–2006), U.S. Army officer

Other uses
The asteroid 146921 Michaelbuckley